Orre Church is a parish church of the Church of Norway in Klepp Municipality in Rogaland county, Norway. It is located in the village of Pollestad. It is the main church for the Orre parish which is part of the Jæren prosti (deanery) in the Diocese of Stavanger. The gray, stone church was built in a long church style in 1950 using designs by the architects Gustav Helland and Endre Årreberg. The church seats about 250 people.

History
The church was built to replace the centuries-old Old Orre Church located in the nearby village of Orre. This church was consecrated on 28 May 1950 by the Bishop Karl Martinussen.

See also
List of churches in Rogaland

References

Klepp
Churches in Rogaland
Stone churches in Norway
20th-century Church of Norway church buildings
Churches completed in 1950
1950 establishments in Norway